Eat 17 is an independently owned group of restaurants and convenience stores in London and Kent. The company was founded in January 2007 by step brothers James Brundle and Chris O'Connor.
It is also the creator of Bacon Jam, which is stocked in over 3000 stores throughout the UK, including Waitrose, Selfridges, Sainsbury's

References

Food and drink companies of England